The Trofeo Città di Castelfidardo was a professional one day cycling race held annually in Italy. It is part of UCI Europe Tour in category 1.1 in 2005 and 2006 and 1.2 in 2008.

Winners

References

Cycle races in Italy
UCI Europe Tour races
Recurring sporting events established in 1981
Recurring sporting events disestablished in 2008
1981 establishments in Italy
2008 disestablishments in Italy
Defunct cycling races in Italy